Qinglongdong Ancient Architectural Complex is located on the cliff of Mount Zhonghe, and on the riverside of Wu River. Three religions, Buddhism, Taoism and Confucianism, co-exist in the Qinglongdong Ancient Architectural Complex, including Zhusheng Bridge, Zhongyuan Chan Temple, Ziyang Academy of Classical Learning, Qinglongdong, Wanshou Palace, and Xiangluyan.

History
Qinglongdong Ancient Architectural Complex was first established in 1388, in the 21st year of Hongwu period (1368–1398) of the Ming dynasty (1368–1644). The complex covers an area of more than 3000 square meters. There are 36 single buildings, most of which are built close to the cliff of Mount Zhonghe. 

On 16 September 1981, it was designated as a cultural relics protection unit at county level. On 23 February 1982, it was inscribed as a cultural relics protection unit. In 1988, it was listed among the third batch of "Major National Historical and Cultural Sites in Guizhou" by the State Council of China.

Gallery

References

Bibliography

Buildings and structures in Zhenyuan County, Guizhou
Major National Historical and Cultural Sites in Hunan
Tourist attractions in Guizhou
Buddhist temples in Guizhou
Taoist temples in Guizhou
Traditional Chinese architecture